The Primetime Emmy Award for Outstanding Sound Editing for a Comedy or Drama Series (Half-Hour) and Animation is an award handed out annually at the Creative Arts Emmy Awards. The category was instituted in 2018. Prior to its creation, one-hour and half-hour series competed together.

In the following list, the first titles listed in gold are the winners; those not in gold are nominees, which are listed in alphabetical order. The years given are those in which the ceremonies took place:



Winners and nominations

2010s

2020s

Programs with multiple wins
2 wins
 Barry

Programs with multiple nominations

3 nominations
 Barry
 Love, Death & Robots
 What We Do in the Shadows

2 nominations
 Ballers
 Cobra Kai
 The Mandalorian 
 Ted Lasso

Notes

References

Sound Editing for a Comedy or Drama Series (Half-Hour) and Animation